Kevin Knight (born October 22, 1976) is an American former professional soccer player who played as a defender.

Youth
Knight attended James Madison University where he played on the men's soccer team from 1995 to 1998.

Professional
On February 6, 1999, the MetroStars drafted Knight in the second round (sixteenth overall) of the 1999 MLS College Draft.  He saw time in eleven games before being waived on November 25, 1999.  In 2000, Knight signed with the Richmond Kickers of the USL A-League.  He spent eight seasons with the Kickers, retiring midway through the 2007 season in order to become a firefighter.  In 2006, Knight and his teammates won the USL Second Division championship.  In February 2008, Knight came out of retirement to rejoin the Kickers.  He suffered from several injures and played in only five games before retiring permanently at the end of the season.

Statistics

References

External links 
 Profile on MetroFanatic
 Richmond Kickers: Kevin Knight

1976 births
Living people
Sportspeople from Fairfax, Virginia
American soccer players
Soccer players from Virginia
Association football defenders
James Madison Dukes men's soccer players
James Madison University alumni
Long Island Rough Riders players
New York Red Bulls players
Major League Soccer players
Richmond Kickers players
A-League (1995–2004) players
USL First Division players
USL Second Division players
New York Red Bulls draft picks